On the Road is an album by the Count Basie Orchestra that won the Grammy Award for Best Jazz Instrumental Performance, Big Band in 1981.

Track listing
 "Wind Machine" (Sammy Nestico) – 3:16
 "Blues for Stephanie" (John Clayton) – 7:01
 "John the III" (Bobby Plater) – 4:55
 "There Will Never Be Another You" (Mack Gordon, Harry Warren) – 2:59
 "Bootie's Blues" (Count Basie, Booty Wood) – 4:00
 "Splanky" (Neal Hefti) – 3:42
 "Basie" (Ernie Wilkins) – 4:27
 "Watch What Happens" (Norman Gimbel, Michel Legrand) – 2:17
 "Work Song" (Nat Adderley, Oscar Brown Jr.) – 4:02
 "In a Mellow Tone" (Duke Ellington, Milt Gabler) – 5:37

Personnel
 Count Basie – piano
 Ray Brown – trumpet
 Paul Cohen – trumpet
 Sonny Cohn – trumpet
 Pete Minger – trumpet
 Bill Hughes – trombone
 Mel Wanzo – trombone
 Dennis Wilson – trombone
 Booty Wood – trombone
 Eric Dixon – saxophone
 Charles Fowlkes – saxophone
 Kenny Hing – saxophone
 Bobby Plater – saxophone
 Danny Turner – saxophone
 John Clayton (bassist) – double bass
 Freddie Green – guitar
 Butch Miles – drums
 Dennis Rowland – vocals

Production
 Norman Granz – producer
 Arne Frager – engineer
 Dave Richards – engineer
 Dennis Sands – engineer

References

1979 albums
Count Basie Orchestra albums
Pablo Records albums
Albums produced by Norman Granz
Grammy Award for Best Large Jazz Ensemble Album